Gaietà Ripoll i Pla (1778, in allegedly from Solsona – 26 July 1826, in Valencia) was a Catalan schoolmaster who was executed for teaching deist principles. He is considered to be the last known victim of the Spanish Inquisition, although technically the Inquisition no longer existed at that time and it was the Junta de Fe of Valencia, until having him hanged by the civil authority.

Life
Ripoll was a soldier in the Spanish army during the Peninsular War (1807–1814). He was captured by French forces and was a prisoner of war. While being held by the French he was taken to France and there he associated with a group of Quakers and became aware of deism. He soon became a deist.

Upon returning to Spain, he used his position as a school master to teach others about deism. There he was soon accused by the Spanish Inquisition of being a deist and of teaching his students about deism. He was later arrested for heresy and held in jail for close to two years.

Accusation
The Chairman of the Board of Faith from the Diocese of Valencia, Miguel Toranzo, an inquisitor, sent to the  nuncio Archbishop of Valencia a report that said Ripoll did not believe in Jesus Christ, in the mystery of the Trinity, in the Incarnation of God the Son, in the Holy Eucharist, in the Virgin Mary, in the Holy Gospels, in the infallibility of the Holy Catholic Church, or in the Apostolic Roman Congregation.  Ripoll did not fulfill his Easter duty, he discouraged children from reciting the  'Ave Maria Purisima' and suggested they need not bother making the sign of the cross.  It was alleged that, according to Ripoll, it was not necessary to hear Mass in order to save one's soul from damnation, and he failed to instruct them to give due reverence to the Sacraments of the Catholic Church, even  the Viaticum administered for the comfort of the sick and to pardon the dying that they might be resurrected into heaven.

Sentence
For his denial of the Catechism of the Catholic Church the clergymen of the Spanish Inquisition requested Ripoll be burned at the stake for his religious offenses. However, the civil authority chose to hang him instead.

Allegedly, the Church authorities, upset that Ripoll had not been burned at the stake, placed his body into a barrel, painted flames on the barrel and buried it in unconsecrated ground. Other reports state that the Church authorities placed his body into a barrel and burned the barrel, throwing the ashes into a river.  Ripoll is recorded as being the last known person to have been executed under sentence from a Church authority for having committed the act of heresy.

Ripoll's famous last words were, "I die reconciled to God and to man."

References

1778 births
1826 deaths
People from Solsonès
People executed by Spain by hanging
People from Valencia
Executed Spanish people
People executed by the Spanish Inquisition
People executed for heresy
19th-century executions by Spain
Spanish deists